Jarvis Ardel Brown (born March 26, 1967) is an American Major League Baseball outfielder who played for the Minnesota Twins, San Diego Padres, Atlanta Braves, and Baltimore Orioles. He won the World Series with the Twins.

Career
Brown was born in Waukegan, Illinois, and attended St. Joseph High School in Kenosha, Wisconsin. After attending Triton Community College, he was drafted by the Twins in the first round (ninth overall) of the 1986 draft. He played in the major leagues from 1991 through 1995, seeing only limited playing time. He was a remarkably fast runner, but did not possess similar talents where hitting was concerned. He had only 227 at bats in the majors, with a career batting average of .203. He hit one home run in his career and drove in ten runs. He did, however, steal thirteen bases.

Brown has a World Series ring, when he was used almost exclusively as a pinch runner by the world champion 1991 Minnesota Twins. In the 1991 American League Championship Series, Brown had no at bats but played in one game and scored one run. During the 1991 World Series, he played in three games and was 0-for-2; he came on in the ninth inning of game seven as a pinch runner, advancing to the third base. Brown thus had the chance to become the first rookie in baseball history to score a World Series-winning run; however, he was stranded. The Twins won anyway, getting Brown a World Series ring.

After baseball
After the completion of his Major League career, Jarvis Brown became head coach of the University of Wisconsin Parkside Rangers baseball program. After a three-year stint, Jarvis was relieved of his duties as head coach, in which he compiled a career record of 31-108.

As of 2009, Brown was an assistant baseball coach at Carthage College.

References

External links

Pura Pelota (Venezuelan Winter League)

1967 births
Living people
African-American baseball players
Atlanta Braves players
Baltimore Orioles players
Baseball players from Illinois
Bowie Baysox players
Carthage Firebirds baseball coaches
Elizabethton Twins players
Kenosha Twins players
Las Vegas Stars (baseball) players
Major League Baseball center fielders
Major League Baseball right fielders
Minor league baseball managers
Minnesota Twins players
Norfolk Tides players
Orlando Sun Rays players
Portland Beavers players
Richmond Braves players
Rochester Red Wings players
San Diego Padres players
Sportspeople from Waukegan, Illinois
Thunder Bay Whiskey Jacks players
Tiburones de La Guaira players
American expatriate baseball players in Venezuela
Tucson Toros players
Triton College alumni
Triton Trojans baseball players
Visalia Oaks players
Waterbury Spirit players
21st-century African-American people
20th-century African-American sportspeople